Zulick is a surname. Notable people with the surname include:

C. Meyer Zulick (1839–1926), American jurist and politician
Samuel Zulick (1824–1876), Union Army officer and medical doctor

See also
 Zulić
 Żulice